Karl Matthew Alvarez (born March 10, 1964) is an American bassist and songwriter for both the Descendents and All, the band that resulted after the Descendents disbanded again in 1987. Alvarez joined the Descendents after the Enjoy! album from his previous bands The Massacre Guys and Bad Yodelers, and played on all of the All albums, and the Descendents albums All, Everything Sucks, Cool To Be You and Hypercaffium Spazzinate. Unlike previous Descendents bassists Tony Lombardo and Doug Carrion, who both used a pick, Alvarez plays finger style bass, and he also provides backing vocals when live (and lead vocals as heard in "Cause" on the All Live Plus One album). Since joining the band he has been a major songwriter contributing many songs to All (both the album and the band), Everything Sucks and Cool To Be You. In the summer of 2006 he joined Gypsy Punk band Gogol Bordello for part of the Van's Warped Tour and the Reading and Leeds Festivals. Alvarez currently plays guitar and sings in Endless Monster and the Vultures.

Since 2004 Alvarez has played with The Last along with Descendents/All drummer Bill Stevenson. He is currently a singer in a band called Endless Monster.

In 2006 Alvarez played on The Lemonheads self-titled comeback album which was released on Los Angeles' Vagrant Records.

During their last two Canadian tours (in 2007 and 2009), Alvarez filled in on bass for Canadian celtic-punk group The Real McKenzies.

Australian punk band Frenzal Rhomb wrote a song about Karl, on their 2011 album, Smoko At The Pet Food Factory, called "Alvarez".

Alvarez suffered a mild heart attack on August 11, 2007.

References

1964 births
Living people
American punk rock bass guitarists
American male bass guitarists
Descendents members
All (band) members
The Lemonheads members
Gogol Bordello members
Guitarists from California
20th-century American guitarists
21st-century American guitarists